"The Second Time Around" is a 1979 hit by Los Angeles-based group Shalamar. The song is the first single from their album, Big Fun. Released in August 1979, the single went to number one on the soul chart and was their most successful hit on the Hot 100 pop chart, reaching number eight in early 1980. "The Second Time Around" also went to number one on the disco/dance chart in January 1980.  The song was produced by Leon Sylvers III, who cowrote the song with William Shelby.

In 1980, the band made a promotion of "The Second Time Around" for the radio station KJR in Seattle, called "The Sonics Came to Play," dedicated to the Seattle SuperSonics who had won the NBA Championship the previous year.

Samples
Missy Elliott interpolated it in her song "Is This Our Last Time?" from her This Is Not a Test! album.

Charts

See also
List of number-one dance singles of 1980 (U.S.)
List of number-one R&B singles of 1980 (U.S.)
List of post-disco artists and songs

References

1979 songs
1979 singles
1980 singles
Shalamar songs
Post-disco songs
Songs written by Leon Sylvers III
SOLAR Records singles